Toru Fukimbara, (冨金原徹, born 18 October 1982), is a Japanese futsal player. Japanese national futsal team.

Titles 
 F.League (1)
 2016-17
 All Japan Futsal Championship (1)
 2017

References

External links
FIFA profile

1982 births
Living people
Futsal goalkeepers
Japanese men's futsal players
Shriker Osaka players
Bardral Urayasu players
People from Kanagawa Prefecture